Four referendums were held in Liechtenstein during 1989. The first two were held on 19 March and concerned introducing referendums to decide on international treaties and amending the health insurance law. The treaty proposal was rejected by 56.8% of voters, whilst the health insurance law was approved by 59%. The third and fourth were held on 3 December on amending the sections of the constitution regarding the control of the justice administration and minority rights. Both were approved by voters.

Results

Introducing referendums on international treaties

Amendment of the health insurance law

Constitutional amendment on control of justice administration

Constitutional amendment on minority rights

References

1989 referendums
1989 in Liechtenstein
Referendums in Liechtenstein
Health in Liechtenstein